This is a list of the albums ranked number one in the Czech Republic. The top-performing albums and EPs in the Czech Republic are ranked on the Albums – Top 100, which is published by the IFPI Czech Republic. The data is based on sales (both at retail and digital), and online streaming on Spotify, Apple Music, Google Play and Deezer.

Lists
 2010s
 2020s

References

External links 

 ifpicr.cz 
 Albums – Top 100 

Czech Republic